The 2021 season was Polis Di-Raja Malaysia's 31st season in existence and the first season in the Malaysia Premier League since relegation from Malaysia Super League last year. Along with the league, the club will also participate in the Malaysia Cup.

Overview
On 24 December 2020, Mat Zan Mat Aris has been appointed as club's new head coach on two-year contract.

On 28 February 2021, Lazarus Kaimbi and Bruno Suzuki joined the club.

On 31 March 2021, Wan Rohaimi Wan Ismail joined as club's new head coach after Mat Zan Mat Aris contract has been terminated.

Players

First-team squad

Competitions

Malaysia Premier League

League table

Matches

Statistics

Appearances and goals
 

|-
! colspan=14 style="background:; color:; text-align:center"| Players transferred out during the season

|}

References

2021
PDRM
PDRM FA